The 1934 Auburn Tigers football team represented Auburn University in the 1934 college football season. The Tigers' were led by head coach Jack Meagher in his first season and finished the season with a record of two wins and eight losses (2–8 overall, 1–6 in the SEC).

Schedule

References

Auburn
Auburn Tigers football seasons
Auburn Tigers football